"I'm Stone in Love with You" is a 1972 single by the Philadelphia soul group The Stylistics. The song is noted for lead singer Russell Thompkins Jr.'s distinctive falsetto singing, which he employs through most of the record. The song was written by Thom Bell, Linda Creed, and Anthony Bell.

It was the first track from the band's 1972 album Round 2 and was released as a single which reached number 10 on the US Billboard Hot 100. It also climbed to number 4 in the Billboard R&B chart and went to number 9 in the UK Singles Chart, in December 1972. The Stylistics' recording sold over one million copies globally, earning them a gold disc The award was presented by the RIAA on December 13, 1972. It was the band's third gold disc.

Chart performance

Weekly charts
The Stylistics

Johnny Mathis cover

Year-end charts

Cover versions
"I'm Stone in Love with You" has been covered in various  pop circles, including in 1973 by Johnny Mathis.  His version became a 1975 hit on the Adult Contemporary charts, reaching number five in Canada and number 16 U.S.    In the UK, Mathis's version of I'm Stone in Love with You", started its 12 weeks run there on January 25, 1975, and made it to number 10.

Jamaican reggae artists Barry Biggs and Inner Circle also covered the song in 1977.

Engelbert Humperdinck covered the song in 1973 for his album, King Of Hearts.

British easy listening and jazz pianist Ronnie Aldrich covered the song on his 1979 album, Tomorrow's Yesterdays.

English pop rock group The Beautiful South covered the song on their 2004 covers album Golddiggas, Headnodders and Pholk Songs.

Scottish band Primal Scream use the repeated lyric "I was stone, stone, stone in love with you" in their song "Damaged" (from the 1991 album Screamadelica).

References

External links
 

1972 singles
The Stylistics songs
Johnny Mathis songs
Songs written by Thom Bell
Songs written by Linda Creed
1972 songs
Avco Records singles